Joseph Leon Edel (9 September 1907 – 5 September 1997) was an American/Canadian literary critic and biographer. He was the elder brother of North American philosopher Abraham Edel.

The Encyclopædia Britannica calls Edel "the foremost 20th-century authority on the life and works of Henry James." His work on James won him both a National Book Award and a Pulitzer Prize.

Life and career

Edel was born in Pittsburgh, Pennsylvania, the son of Fannie (Malamud) and Simon Edel. Edel grew up in Yorkton, Saskatchewan. He attended McGill University and the University of Paris. While at the former he was associated with the Montreal Group of modernist writers, which included F.R. Scott and A.J.M. Smith, and with them founded the influential McGill Fortnightly Review. Edel taught English and American literature at Sir George Williams University (now Concordia University, 1932–1934), New York University (1953–1972), and at the University of Hawaiʻi at Mānoa (1972–1978). For the academic year 1965–1966, he was a Fellow on the faculty at the Center for Advanced Studies of Wesleyan University. During WWII, Edel trained at Camp Ritchie and is one of the Ritchie Boys. He discussed his time at camp in his memoir "The Visitable Past". From 1944 to 1952, he worked as a reporter and feature writer for the left-wing New York newspapers PM and the Daily Compass.

Though he wrote on James Joyce (James Joyce: The Last Journey, 1947) and on the Bloomsbury group, his lifework is summed up in his five-volume biography of Henry James (Henry James: A Biography 1953–1972). Edel discussed the notion of biography in Literary Biography (1957), in particular his conviction that literary biography should enfold a subjective author's self-perceptions into his output. Edel's second and third volumes of the James biography earned him the 1963 Pulitzer Prize for Biography or Autobiography 
and a National Book Award for Nonfiction
in 1963. Edel enjoyed privileged access to letters and documents from James' life housed in the Widener Library at Harvard University, after gaining the blessing of members of James' family. He referred to other scholars who sought access in vain as 'trespassers'.

The discovery of impassioned but inconclusive letters written in 1875–1876 by James to the Russian aristocrat Paul Zhukovski, while Edel was deep in 
the process of finishing his biography caused an ethical crisis; his decision was to continue to ignore what he considered a peripheral aspect of the self-identified "celibate" and sexually diffident James's life. Edel did treat James's relationships with novelist Constance Fenimore Woolson and sculptor Hendrik Christian Andersen at length, especially in volumes three and four of the biography. After weighing all the evidence, Edel confessed that he was 
unable to decide whether James experienced a consummated sexual relationship. Although later scholarship and new materials have called into question the accuracy of his portrait of James,
Edel's work remains an important source for studies of the author.

In October 1996, about a year before Leon Edel died, Sheldon M. Novick published Henry James: The Young Master (in 2007 Novick also published Henry James: The Mature Master).  Novick's volume "caused something of an uproar in Jamesian circles" as, like other more recent biographies of Walt Whitman and John Singer Sargent, it challenged the notion, deriving from a once-familiar paradigm in biographies of homosexuals when direct evidence was non-existent, that James lived a celibate life.  Novick also criticized Edel for following a discounted Freudian interpretation of homosexuality "as a kind of failure." The difference of views led to a series of exchanges between Edel and Novick that were published by Slate.

'A biography seems irrelevant if it doesn't discover the overlap between what the individual did and the life that made this possible. Without discovering that, you have shapeless happenings and gossip." — Leon Edel

Selected bibliography
 Henry James: The Untried Years 1843–1870 (1953)
 Henry James: Selected Fiction (Everyman's Library [New American Edition], no. 649A, 1953)
 Literary Biography (1957)
 Henry James: The Conquest of London 1870–1881 (1962) 
 Henry James: The Middle Years 1882–1895 (1962) 
 Henry James: The Treacherous Years 1895–1901 (1969) 
 Henry James: The Master 1901–1916 (1972) 
 A Bibliography of Henry James: Third Edition (1982) (with Dan Laurence and James Rambeau) 
 Henry James Literary Criticism – Essays on Literature, American Writers, English Writers (1984) (editor, with Mark Wilson) 
 Henry James Literary Criticism – French Writers, Other European Writers, The Prefaces to the New York Edition (1984) (editor, with Mark Wilson) 
 Writing Lives: Principia Biographica (1984) 
 The Complete Plays of Henry James (1990) (editor) 
 The Visitable Past: A Wartime Memoir (2000)

Reviews 
 Writing Lives: Principia Biographica  - briefly noted in The New Yorker 60/49 (21 January 1985) : 94

References

External links
Leon Edel biography at University of Saskatchewan archives
 
Edel responds to the biography  detailing James' alleged homosexual attachment: Sheldon M. Novick, Henry James, The Young Master 1996
Novick answers

1907 births
1997 deaths
Ritchie Boys
American expatriates in Canada
American expatriates in France
American male biographers
National Book Award winners
Pulitzer Prize for Biography or Autobiography winners
Writers from Pittsburgh
Academic staff of Concordia University
University of Paris alumni
New York University faculty
Wesleyan University faculty
McGill University alumni
Members of the American Academy of Arts and Letters